The IFL National Championship (formerly the United Bowl) is the Indoor Football League's championship game. It has been played every year since 2009, except for 2020 due to the COVID-19 pandemic. The current champions are the Northern Arizona Wranglers, who won their first IFL National Championship in 2022, their second season in the league. The Sioux Falls Storm won six straight United Bowls from 2011 to 2016.

History
The IFL continued to use the "United Bowl" name originally used by United Indoor Football (UIF). The UIF used this name before they merged with Intense Football League to form the Indoor Football League. The UIF held United Bowl I, II, III, and IV in 2005 through 2008, with all four being won by the Sioux Falls Storm. Although the name "National Indoor Bowl Championship" was used for the 2008 contest between the UIF and the Intense Football League, the "United Bowl" name continued to be used for the combined league's championship until 2021 when it was rebranded.

2009 United Bowl

The 2009 United Bowl featured the Intense Conference champs, the Billings Outlaws, against the upset-minded United Conference champs River City Rage. The game became a scoring onslaught at the start of the first quarter with each team scoring touchdowns. The Outlaws defense snagged a pick in the second quarter which led to another offensive touchdown and a commanding two score lead by halftime. The Rage fought back though, recovering an onside kick at the beginning of the third quarter and driving the ball the length of the field for a touchdown. That would be the closest the game would get for the Rage. The Outlaws would put up just enough points to keep a comfortable lead throughout the fourth and after recovering an onside kick in the last minute of the game, the Outlaws kneeled the ball and took home the crown with a score of 71–62 in a loud, sold-out Rimrock Auto Arena.

2010 United Bowl

In the 2010 United Bowl, the Billings Outlaws of the Intense Conference took the league championship by defeating the Sioux Falls Storm of the United Conference by a score of 43–34 in front of a sold-out crowd in the Billings Sportsplex (a training facility, used by the Outlaws after their arena suffered storm damage during the Billings tornado).

2011 United Bowl

The 2011 United Bowl was won by the United Conference champion Sioux Falls Storm when they beat the Intense Conference Champion Tri-Cities Fever 37–10 on July 16, 2011.

2012 United Bowl

The 2012 United Bowl was a re-match from 2011 and was once again won by the United Conference champion Sioux Falls Storm when they beat the Intense Conference Champion Tri-Cities Fever 59–32 on July 14, 2012.

2013 United Bowl

The 2013 United Bowl was once again won by the United Conference champion Sioux Falls Storm when they beat the Intense Conference Champion Nebraska Danger 43–40 on June 29, 2013.

2014 United Bowl

The 2014 United Bowl was a rematch from 2013 and was once again won by the United Conference champion Sioux Falls Storm when they beat the Intense Conference Champion Nebraska Danger 63–46 on June 28, 2014.

2015 United Bowl

The 2015 United Bowl was a rematch from 2013 and 2014. For the fifth consecutive year the United Conference champion Storm won the league title with at 62–27 victory over the Intense Conference champion (Nebraska Danger). It was Sioux Falls' ninth title in franchise history.

2016 United Bowl

For the sixth consecutive year the United Conference Champion Storm won the league title with a 55–34 victory over the first year Intense Conference Champion Spokane Empire on July 23, 2016. It is Sioux Falls' tenth title in franchise history.

2017 United Bowl

The Sioux Falls Storm advanced to their eighth consecutive United Bowl but lost to the Arizona Rattlers by a score of 50–41. It was the Rattlers first season in the IFL after 25 years in the Arena Football League.

2018 United Bowl

The Sioux Falls Storm once again advanced to the United Bowl, their ninth straight. They were defeated by the Iowa Barnstormers 42–38, marking the Barnstormers' first title in the IFL.

2019 United Bowl
The Sioux Falls Storm reached the United Bowl once again, this time their tenth straight. They beat their United Bowl losing streak that started in 2017, and beat the Arizona Rattlers (a rematch from 2017's United Bowl) 56–53. This was their 11th Franchise Title.

2021 United Bowl
For the first time since 2009, the Sioux Falls Storm did not qualify for the United Bowl. On September 12, the Massachusetts Pirates defeated the Arizona Rattlers 37–34 in overtime, earning the Pirates their first title in their first season as a member of the IFL.

2022 IFL National Championship Game
The Indoor Football League struck a deal to rebrand the United Bowl to the IFL National Championship Game for three years. Said games are to all be held at the Dollar Loan Center in Henderson, Nevada, home of the Vegas Knight Hawks.

For the first game under the new format, the Northern Arizona Wranglers defeated the Quad City Steamwheelers 47–45, earning the Wranglers their first title in their second season as a member of the IFL.

Results

References

United Bowl
Recurring sporting events established in 2009
Indoor American football competitions
American football bowls
2009 establishments in the United States